Avocet is the 12th album by Scottish folk musician Bert Jansch, released in 1979 in UK. The album was first released by Ex Libris in Denmark in late 1978 with alternate album cover and one alternate track title, although no difference in recorded content. The title track "Avocet" was inspired by the traditional song "The Cuckoo". All tracks on the album are named after a sea bird or wading bird.

On 5 February 2016, Earth Recordings reissued the album (remastered by Brian Pyle, with new sleeve art) in digital, CD, and vinyl formats; the latter available in an 'art edition' which included six lithograph prints of illustrations of each of the birds on the album, made by Hannah Alice.

Track listing 
All tracks composed by Bert Jansch; except where indicated
 (All the tracks on this album are instrumentals)
 "Avocet" - 17:59
 "Lapwing" - 1:33
 "Bittern" - 7:49
 "Kingfisher" - 3:44
 "Osprey" (Martin Jenkins) - 3:14
 "Kittiwake" - 2:47

Personnel 
 Bert Jansch - guitar, piano
 Martin Jenkins - mandocello, violin, flute
 Danny Thompson - bass

References 

Bert Jansch albums
1979 albums
Charisma Records albums